Casla or CASLA may refer to:

Casla, a village in County Galway, Ireland
Casla, Segovia, a municipality in the province of Segovia, Spain
Câșla, a tributary of the river Elan in Vaslui County, Romania
Club Atlético San Lorenzo de Almagro, an Argentinian soccer club